DeKalb High School may refer to several schools in the United States:

DeKalb High School (Illinois), DeKalb, Illinois
DeKalb High School (Indiana), Waterloo, Indiana
DeKalb High School (Texas), DeKalb, Texas
DeKalb County High School, Smithville, Tennessee
DeKalb School of the Arts, Atlanta, Georgia
Southwest DeKalb High School, DeKalb County, Georgia